The Emirates Airline Wellington Sevens is played annually as part of the IRB Sevens World Series for international rugby sevens (seven-a-side version of rugby union). The 2010 competition, took place on 4 February and 5 February  the third of eight Cup tournaments in the 2009–10 IRB Sevens World Series. Fiji won the tournament, its first title of the season, with a victory over Samoa in the final.

Teams

Pool Stages

Pool A
{| class="wikitable" style="text-align: center;"
|-
!width="200"|Team
!width="40"|Pld
!width="40"|W
!width="40"|D
!width="40"|L
!width="40"|PF
!width="40"|PA
!width="40"|+/-
!width="40"|Pts
|-
|align=left| 
|3||3||0||0||97||17||80||9
|-
|align=left| 
|3||2||0||1||83||34||49||7
|-
|align=left| 
|3||1||0||2||36||79||-43||5
|-
|align=left| 
|3||0||0||3||27||113||-86||3
|}

Pool B
{| class="wikitable" style="text-align: center;"
|-
!width="200"|Team
!width="40"|Pld
!width="40"|W
!width="40"|D
!width="40"|L
!width="40"|PF
!width="40"|PA
!width="40"|+/-
!width="40"|Pts
|-
|align=left| 
|3||3||0||0||115||12||103||9
|-
|align=left| 
|3||2||0||1||62||57||5||7
|-
|align=left| 
|3||1||0||2||46||65||-19||5
|-
|align=left| 
|3||0||0||3||17||106||-89||3
|}

Pool C
{| class="wikitable" style="text-align: center;"
|-
!width="200"|Team
!width="40"|Pld
!width="40"|W
!width="40"|D
!width="40"|L
!width="40"|PF
!width="40"|PA
!width="40"|+/-
!width="40"|Pts
|-
|align=left| 
|3||3||0||0||79||36||43||9
|-
|align=left| 
|3||2||0||1||49||38||11||7
|-
|align=left| 
|3||1||0||2||29||62||-33||5
|-
|align=left| 
|3||0||0||3||33||54||-21||3
|}

Pool D
{| class="wikitable" style="text-align: center;"
|-
!width="200"|Team
!width="40"|Pld
!width="40"|W
!width="40"|D
!width="40"|L
!width="40"|PF
!width="40"|PA
!width="40"|+/-
!width="40"|Pts
|-
|align=left| 
|3||3||0||0||91||47||44||9
|-
|align=left| 
|3||2||0||1||61||53||8||7
|-
|align=left| 
|3||1||0||2||40||64||-24||5
|-
|align=left| 
|3||0||0||3||43||71||-28||3
|}

Knockout

Shield

Bowl

Plate

Cup

Statistics

Individual points

Individual tries

External links
 New Zealand Rugby 7s
 IRB Sevens
 New Zealand 7s on irb.com

Wellington Sevens
Wellington
2010